The sixth season of Gilmore Girls, an American dramedy television series, began airing on September 13, 2005 on The WB television network. The season concluded on May 9, 2006, after 22 episodes. The season aired Tuesday nights at 8/7c. This was the final season to air on The WB, before the network and rival UPN merged to form The CW in the fall of 2006.

On March 22, 2006, The CW announced that the show was renewed for a seventh season.

Overview
The season picks up at the moment the fifth season ended, with Lorelai having just proposed to Luke. Luke accepts but they decide to delay the wedding until after she has reconciled with Rory. During the estrangement, Lorelai buys a dog and names it Paul Anka. Rory is given 300 hours of community service for the boat theft and Emily gets her a job in the office at the Daughters of the American Revolution. However, Rory begins to resent Emily's attempts to control her and after a visit from Jess, in which he argues with Rory about her decision to work for the DAR and her quitting Yale. Rory confronts Logan about her lifestyle and they decide to take a break. Rory then reconciles with Lorelai, moves back home, and returns to school.

Doyle steps down as editor of The Yale Daily News and is replaced by Paris. The couple gets an apartment near the college and Rory moves into their spare room. However, Paris soon alienates the newsroom with her bullying style of leadership and is voted out, and Rory is chosen to replace her. Paris throws Rory out and she moves in with Logan, who Rory reconciliates with after reading a letter from Lorelai.

Rory and Logan break up, when Rory discovers Logan slept with other women during their break. Rory later decides to forgive him and they get back together, until Logan realizes Rory still isn't over the cheating and decides to do a stunt with the Life and Death Brigade. During this time, Rory visits Jess at his publishing company in Philadelphia, but leaves after kissing him in order to make Logan jealous. Rory and Logan begin dating again later in the season when Logan is injured during a Life and Death Brigade stunt and Rory nurses him during his convalescence.

Zach becomes jealous of Lane's friendship with Brian and starts a fight on stage as the band are about to play for a record label. However, Zach manages to bring everyone back together and proposes to Lane. They marry towards the end of the season.

Christopher inherits a large sum of money from his father and offers to do something for Lorelai and Rory. Rory asks him to pay her Yale fees, freeing her from her obligation to Richard and Emily. They are upset by this decision, but a Friday night dinner spent working through their difficulties sees the Gilmores on good terms again.

Michel objects to Luke being used as an unofficial handyman at the inn but this turns out to be because he misses his planning sessions with Lorelai.

Lorelai and Sookie throw themselves into organizing the wedding. Luke learns he has a 12-year-old daughter, April Nardini when runs a DNA test for a science fair project. He hides April from Lorelai for two months. Even after Lorelai learns about April, he keeps them apart since he is worried April will like Lorelai better. April's protective mother, Anna, doesn't want her daughter getting attached to someone who might not be permanently in Luke's life. Luke postpones the wedding while he gets to know April.

In the season finale, Logan graduates from college and Rory throws him a farewell party before Mitchum sends him to London for a year. Lorelai tries to get Luke to elope with her, but he refuses and she calls off the engagement altogether. The season closes with Lorelai waking up to discover she has spent the night with Christopher.

Cast

Main cast
 Lauren Graham as Lorelai Gilmore, Rory's mother.
 Alexis Bledel as Rory Gilmore, Lorelai's daughter.
 Melissa McCarthy as Sookie St. James, Lorelai's best friend and co-worker.
 Scott Patterson as Luke Danes, Lorelai's fiance and the owner of the local diner.
 Keiko Agena as Lane Kim, Rory's best friend.
 Yanic Truesdale as Michel Gerard, Lorelai and Sookie's co-worker.
 Liza Weil as Paris Geller, Rory's classmate and close friend.
 Sean Gunn as Kirk Gleason, a resident of Stars Hollow who works many jobs.
 Matt Czuchry as Logan Huntzberger, Rory's boyfriend.
 Kelly Bishop as Emily Gilmore, Lorelai's mother and Rory's grandmother.
 Edward Herrmann as Richard Gilmore, Lorelai's father and Rory's grandfather.

Recurring cast
 Jackson Douglas as Jackson Belleville, Sookie's husband.
 Liz Torres as Miss Patty, the owner of the local dance studio.
 Emily Kuroda as Mrs. Kim, Lane's religious mother.
 Sally Struthers as Babette Dell, Lorelai and Rory's next-door neighbor.
 Ted Rooney as Morey Dell, Lorelai and Rory's next-door neighbor.
 Michael Winters as Taylor Doose, the owner of the local grocery store.
 David Sutcliffe as Christopher Hayden, Rory's father and Lorelai's ex-boyfriend.
 Todd Lowe as Zach Van Gerbig, Lane's fiance, and bandmate.
 John Cabrera as Brian Fuller, Lane's bandmate.
 Sebastian Bach as Gil, Lane's bandmate.
 Danny Strong as Doyle McMaster, Paris's boyfriend.
 Kathleen Wilhoite as Liz Danes, Luke's younger sister.
 Michael DeLuise as TJ, Liz's husband.
 Gregg Henry as Mitchum Huntzberger, Logan's father.
 Sherilyn Fenn as Anna Nardini, Luke's ex-girlfriend and April's mother.
 Vanessa Marano as April Nardini, Luke and Anna's daughter.
 Devon Sorvai as Honor Huntzberger, Logan's younger sister.
 Amy Salon as Sheila, Rory's classmate.
 Devon Michaels as Bill, Rory's classmate.
 Rona Benson as Joni, Rory's classmate.
 Nicolette Collier as Gigi Hayden, Christopher and Sherry's daughter, and Rory's half-sister.
 Tanc Sade as Finn, Logan's friend.
 Alan Loayza as Colin McCrae, Logan's friend.

Guest
 Melora Hardin as Carolyn Bates, Emily's friend.
 Milo Ventimiglia as Jess Mariano, Liz's son, Luke's nephew, and Rory's ex-boyfriend.

Episodes

DVD release

References

Season
2005 American television seasons
2006 American television seasons